Roberto Romanini (born 11 April 1966) is an Italian lightweight rower. He won a gold medal at the 1989 World Rowing Championships in Bled with the lightweight men's eight.

References

1966 births
Living people
Italian male rowers
World Rowing Championships medalists for Italy